The 1895–96 Northern Football League season was the seventh in the history of the Northern Football League, a football competition in Northern England.

Clubs

The league featured 8 clubs which competed in the last season, along with one new club:
 Saltburn Swifts

Also Howden Rangers changed name to Howden-le-Wear.

League table

References

1895-96
1895–96 in English association football leagues